Richard Michael Barrett (born June 22, 1964), better known as Dicky Barrett, is an American singer who was the frontman of ska punk band The Mighty Mighty Bosstones. He was the announcer for Jimmy Kimmel Live! until 2022. Barrett is known for his distinctive loud, gravelly voice. 

The Mighty Mighty Bosstones officially announced their breakup through their official website and social media feeds on January 27, 2022. Barrett revealed that the breakup occurred in part due to his views on the COVID-19 vaccine. Barrett currently is the frontman for the punk band The Defiant.

Personal life
Born in Providence, Rhode Island, Barrett attended Norwood Junior High School and Xaverian Brothers High School in Massachusetts. He left Xaverian Brothers High School and went on to Norwood Senior High Norwood, MA and later Bunker Hill Community College where he met Bosstones drummer Joe Sirois. He now lives in Phoenix, Arizona. He has mentioned that he is an Irish Catholic. He married Rosemary in 2002.

Music
Prior to his association with the Bosstones, Barrett played in the local Boston area bands Cheapskates, Toxic Toast (as mentioned in Michael Patrick MacDonald's book Easter Rising: An Irish American Coming Up from Under), and Impact Unit. Toxic Toast would later be immortalized in a Bosstones song of the same name on the group's 1994 album Question the Answers.

Barrett has spent the majority of his musical career playing with the Mighty Mighty Bosstones. He appeared on eight full-length albums, three EPs and a live album with the Bosstones, as well as touring continuously throughout the world, until the band's announcement of a hiatus in December 2003. The band's 1997 release, Let's Face It, would prove to be the band's biggest break, mostly due to the first single "The Impression That I Get," which charted at number one on the Billboard charts.

In 2003, Barrett began working on an untitled solo album. The album was said to be a radical departure from the ska-core sound made popular by the Bosstones. Barrett was quoted as saying that the album will be "more sombre, darker". Fellow Bosstone, Lawerence Katz, was said to be assisting Barrett with the recording of the album. However, there has been no further mention of the album, and it's uncertain whether the album will be released.

Barrett appeared on two Brain Failure tracks, which are featured on their split entitled "Beijing to Boston" with Big D and the Kids Table.

Barrett had guest vocals on the Street Dogs song "Justifiable Fisticuffs" from their first album Savin Hill, on The Gaslight Anthem song "The Patient Ferris Wheel" from their album The '59 Sound, on "Charge into The Sun" from The Briggs' album Come All You Madmen, on The Unseen's cover of "Paint It Black" from the album State of Discontent, and also on H2O songs "Force Field" and "Faster Than The World" from their 1999 album F.T.T.W., as well as Rancid's songs "Cash, Culture and Violence" and "Black Lung" on their album Life Won't Wait. He also made guest appearances on tracks from No Use For A Name, Clowns For Progress, the Stubborn All-Stars, and local Boston band Darkbuster.

Barrett announced that the 10th official Hometown Throwdown would occur between December 26–30, 2007 at Cambridge, Massachusetts' famed Middle East. Barrett also confirmed that the Bosstones would be joining him. He seemed unwilling to confirm any long-term plans for the band.  Aside from the 10th Throwdown, he performed with the rest of the Bosstones on New Year's Eve 2007 in Providence, RI.

The Bosstones returned to the recording studio to record three new songs, which were included with unreleased material and vinyl B-sides on a collection titled Medium Rare released on December 18, 2007.

In January 2022, Rolling Stone reported that Barrett produced a song and music video for Robert F. Kennedy, Jr. to promote an anti-vaccine rally. Five days later, the Bosstones announced on Facebook and their website that they were breaking up. Though the band did not state the reason for the breakup, Rolling Stone speculated that it was related to Barrett's involvement in the song and video. News of his involvement with Kennedy and the band's breakup came shortly after Barrett abruptly left Jimmy Kimmel Live! two weeks prior.

On March 6, 2023, it was announced that Barrett had formed a new band with members of The Offspring, Street Dogs, Smash Mouth and The Briggs called The Defiant. The group will release their debut album in early 2023.

Radio
Barrett became the host of his own radio show, the "Mighty Morning Show" on Los Angeles radio's Indie 103.1 FM from 2005 until his firing on March 22, 2006, under mysterious circumstances.

He was a regular on three of Boston's rock stations: WAAF, WBCN, and WFNX.

In 2005, it was rumored that Barrett would be Howard Stern's replacement at heritage rock station WBCN.

On the April 13, 2009 episode of The Adam Carolla Podcast, Dicky Barrett was Adam's guest. Over the years, he has also been a regular guest on Adam's former show, Loveline.

He was a guest on Bill Simmons' The B.S. Report Podcast on December 8, 2009, with Cousin Sal and Super Dave Osborne.

On screen
Barrett first reached a national TV audience appearing in an ad for Converse shoes in 1991.  In the mid-1990s, Barrett appeared as a bus driver on the Nickelodeon show Bus No 9.  In 1995, he appeared with the rest of the Bosstones in the film Clueless, playing at a fraternity party.

While with the Bosstones, Barrett performed on several television shows, including Saturday Night Live, The Jon Stewart Show, as well as Sesame Street's Elmopalooza.

Barrett portrays a prison inmate in the unreleased 1999 film Big Helium Dog.

In 2004, after the Bosstones went on hiatus, Barrett became the announcer for ABC's Jimmy Kimmel Live!.  That year he also had a cameo role in the film Home of Phobia which was screened at the Sundance Film Festival.

Barrett has also done voice-over work for Minoriteam and appears in the documentary film American Hardcore. He has appeared on an episode of Criss Angel's Mind Freak. He also portrayed rock pioneer Bill Haley in the miniseries Shake, Rattle, and Roll: An American Love Story.

References

External links
 
An old Interview with Barrett

1964 births
American ska singers
American punk rock singers
American radio personalities
American television personalities
Catholics from Rhode Island
Bunker Hill Community College alumni
Living people
Musicians from Providence, Rhode Island
American ska musicians
People from Norwood, Massachusetts
Singers from Massachusetts
Catholics from Massachusetts
The Mighty Mighty Bosstones members
American baritones